Untitled Earth Sim 64 is a 2021 science-fiction comedy short film written and directed by Jonathan Wilhelmsson (who previously made Waltzing Tilda). The story is about Marie, a woman who comes to learn that her universe is an untitled simulation. The film was shot in Gothenburg, Sweden, and was released in May 2021 along with a behind the scenes documentary on the making of the film. It was later released by Gunpowder & Sky under their science-fiction label Dust.

Plot 
Marie is an offbeat woman who suspects that all is not right with the world. After experiencing various glitches in reality, she is called upon by a mysterious being that accidentally lets slip that her universe is a simulation. Marie’s life quickly unravels at this revelation, as she desperately looks for meaning in an untitled simulation.

Cast 

 Karen Olrich-White as Marie
 Alexandra Frick as Friend
 James Fraser as The Researcher (voice)

References

External links 

Untitled Earth Sim 64 on YouTube

2021 short films
Science fiction short films
Swedish science fiction comedy films
2020s science fiction comedy films
2020s English-language films